Human Rights Monitor may refer to any of the following organisations:
 Euro-Mediterranean Human Rights Monitor (Euro-Med HRM)
 Hong Kong Human Rights Monitor

See also List of human rights organisations